Ray Cooper is an English musician.

Ray Cooper may also refer to:

Ray Cooper (fighter)
Ray Cooper (singer-songwriter)